Souk Es Sabbaghine (English: Dyers market) is one of the souks of the medina of Tunis.

Location 

The souk is situated at the outskirts of the medina, far from the center where the Al-Zaytuna Mosque is situated, since dyeing is considered a polluting activity. The souk is a continuation of Souk El Blat and may also be accessed from Bab El Jazira.

History 
The name of Souk Es Sabbaghine, or Souk of Dyers, is due to its original function as the souk of wool, cotton and silk dyeing which is situated next to a previously existing fountain.

Two Italian doctors constructed a dispensary at this souk in 1887 called Infermeria Santa Margherita which supported the poor from Italian and Maltese communities.

Products 
Products sold at the souk include clothing, shoes as well as fish and meat.

Monuments 
Harmel Mosque, also known as Bab Al Jazira Mosque is located in souk Es Sabbaghine.

El Jedid Mosque is situated in the center of the souk.

Notes and references 

Sabbaghine
Fish markets
Dyes